The Schenk von Stauffenberg family is a noble (Uradel) Roman Catholic family from Swabia in Germany. The family's best-known recent member was Colonel Claus Schenk Graf von Stauffenberg – the key figure in the 1944 "20 July plot" to assassinate Adolf Hitler.

History 
The recorded history of the Schenk von Stauffenberg family begins in Swabia in the 13th century, when the family, who belonged to the Reichsrittern (Imperial Knights), originated from the settlement Cell, where they owned extensive estates surrounding the village and the Zollerberg.

The officeholder was in charge of his lord's wine cellars and vineyards, and when the office of Schenk later became hereditary within the family, the title was adopted into the family name.

Surnames were appended according to the officeholder's place of residence, and so the family name varied between Schenk von Zell, Schenk von Neuenzell, Schenk von Andeck, Schenk von Erpfingen and Schenk von Stauffenberg. By the end of the 15th century, the family's permanent name was Schenk von Stauffenberg, which refers to Burg Stauffenberg, a former castle situated by a small cone-shaped mountain of the same name between the small town of Hechingen and its suburb Rangendingen in Land Württemberg. A tradition in the family also associates it with the Staufen dynasty.

The Stauffenbergs rose in the world in 1698 when Emperor Leopold I conferred upon the brothers Maximilian Gottfried and Johann Philipp the hereditary title of Reichsfreiherr (Imperial Baron). The family was later split into four branches: the Katzensteiner, Bacher, Wilflinger and Amerdinger ones. The former two became extinct during the 18th century, while a member of the Wilflinger branch was raised to the rank of hereditary Reichsgraf (Imperial Count) by Emperor Leopold II in 1785. Since the Wilflinger branch also became extinct in 1833, only the baronial Amerdinger branch remained. All now living members of the family are descendants of the brothers Franz Ludwig and Friedrich of the Amerdinger branch. Franz Ludwig was made a hereditary Graf (Count) in the Kingdom of Bavaria by King Ludwig II. Since then, there exist two sub-branches: one which holds the title of Count and one which bears the title of Imperial Baron.

In the 16th century, the Stauffenberg family acquired the Amerdingen castle near Nördlingen through marriage. Before that, the Stauffenbergs were owners of Wilflingen and Jettingen. Over the course of the years, further estates were added to the family's possessions, such as Schloss Greifenstein and Schloss Burggrub in Heiligenstadt near Bamberg, the Lautlingen castle near Ebingen on the southern slopes of the Schwäbische Alb, Schloss Rißtissen some twenty kilometers south of Ulm, and the Straßberg and Wildentierberg estates in Lautlingen near Albstadt.

After 1918, when the constitution of the Weimar Republic abolished all noble titles in Germany and declared them to be part of the family name, the family came to have two names in order to preserve the former titles of Schenk, Graf (Count) and Freiherr (Baron) as parts of the surnames.

Since the title of Schenk is considered to be of superior rank due to being a hereditary office title, it is placed before the noble title, which in turn is placed before the surname. The correct versions of the family's surnames are thus Schenk Graf von Stauffenberg and Schenk Freiherr von Stauffenberg respectively. Two of the family's members also served as Prince-Bishops – of Bamberg (Marquard Sebastian), and of Augsburg and Konstanz (Johann Franz) – and thus they used the title of Fürst (Prince) instead of their other noble titles.

Notable family members 
 Marquard Sebastian Schenk von Stauffenberg, Prince-Bishop of Bamberg (14 May 1644 – 9 Oct 1693)
 Johann Franz Schenk von Stauffenberg. Prince-Bishop of Constance (1658–1740)
 Berthold Schenk Graf von Stauffenberg (15 Mar 1905 – 10 Aug 1944)
 Philippe von Stauffenberg (born 17 May 1964)
 Alexander Schenk Graf von Stauffenberg (15 Mar 1905 – 27 Jan 1964)
 Melitta Schenk Gräfin von Stauffenberg (9 Jan 1903 – 8 Apr 1945)
 Claus Schenk Graf von Stauffenberg (15 Nov 1907 – 20 Jul 1944)
 Nina Schenk Gräfin von Stauffenberg (27 Aug 1913 – 2 Apr 2006)
 Berthold Maria Schenk Graf von Stauffenberg (born 3 Jul 1934)
 Franz-Ludwig Schenk Graf von Stauffenberg (born 4 May 1938)

See also 
Master of the Stauffenberg Altarpiece

References 
http://www.schwaben-kultur.de/pdfs/2003-3.pdf

External links 

 
German families
Roman Catholic families